The International Balloon Festival of Saint-Jean-sur-Richelieu is the largest hot air balloon festival in Canada. It is held each August in Saint-Jean-sur-Richelieu, Quebec, about 40 minutes southeast of Montreal and about halfway between Montreal and Vermont.

The festival is situated at the Saint-Jean Airport and weather permitting (no storm activity detected within range, and winds above ), there are two flight launches each day: a morning flight at 6:00 am and an evening flight between 6:00 and 7:00 pm. Other festival activities include amusement rides, musical and comedy shows and "Nuits magiques" (tethered night flights).

This festival went on hiatus in 2020.

External links
Official site (English)

Hot air balloon festivals
Festivals in Quebec
Saint-Jean-sur-Richelieu
Tourist attractions in Montérégie
Sports festivals in Canada